is the ninth studio album by Japanese singer/songwriter Mari Hamada, released on June 7, 1989 by Invitation. It is Hamada's second album to be produced by Greg Edward, and it features contributions by Chicago members Bill Champlin and Jason Scheff. It was also Hamada's last album to be issued on LP. The album was reissued alongside Hamada's past releases on January 15, 2014.

Return to Myself became Hamada's first album to hit No. 1 on Oricon's albums chart. It was also certified Platinum by the RIAJ. In addition, the title track "Return to Myself ~Shinai, Shinai, Natsu." became her first No. 1 on Oricon's singles chart.

Track listing

Personnel 
 Michael Landau – guitar
 Tim Pierce – guitar
 John Pierce – bass
 Randy Kerber – keyboards
 Charles Judge – keyboards
 John Keane – drums, percussion
 Danny Fongheiser – percussion
 Bill Champlin – backing vocals
 Jason Scheff – backing vocals

Charts

Certification

References

External links 
  (Mari Hamada)
  (Victor Entertainment)
 
 

1989 albums
Japanese-language albums
Mari Hamada albums
Victor Entertainment albums